The discography of American singer-songwriter and guitarist John Mayer consists of eight studio albums, seven live albums, three compilation albums, two video albums, four extended plays, twenty-five singles and seventeen music videos. Born in Bridgeport, Connecticut, Mayer moved to Atlanta, Georgia and began playing in local clubs in 1998. He released the extended play Inside Wants Out in September of the following year. Inside Wants Out, as well as continued performances, brought Mayer to the attention of independent record label Aware Records. Aware later signed Mayer and released his full-length debut studio album, Room for Squares, in June 2001. When Columbia Records acquired Aware, the album was re-released in September and promoted as a major label release. Following its re-release, Room for Squares peaked at number eight on the United States Billboard 200. The album has since sold over five million copies in the United States, and was certified five times platinum by the Recording Industry Association of America (RIAA). Three singles were released from Room for Squares, two of which became top 40 hits on the US Billboard Hot 100: "No Such Thing" and "Your Body Is a Wonderland". Heavier Things, Mayer's second studio album, was released in September 2003. It topped the Billboard 200 and attained a double platinum certification from the RIAA. Heavier Things produced three singles: "Bigger Than My Body", "Clarity" and "Daughters". "Daughters" later won the award for Song of the Year at the 47th Grammy Awards.

After a brief recording hiatus, during which he ventured to form the blues group John Mayer Trio, Mayer resumed his solo career and released his third studio album Continuum in September 2006. Continuum reached a peak of number two on the Billboard 200. "Waiting on the World to Change", the album's first single, peaked at number 14 on the Billboard Hot 100 and garnered commercial success in countries such as Australia and Canada. Battle Studies followed in November 2009, topping the Billboard 200 and being certified platinum by the RIAA. The album featured the singles "Who Says", "Heartbreak Warfare" and "Half of My Heart", all of which reached the top 40 in the United States. Mayer released his fifth studio album Born and Raised in May 2012; it became his third number-one album on the Billboard 200. His sixth studio album Paradise Valley was released on August 20, 2013, bringing forth 3 singles: "Paper Doll", "Wildfire" and "Who You Love" featuring Katy Perry. Mayer's seventh studio album, The Search for Everything, was released in April 2017.

Mayer has sold 16 million albums in the United States as of January 2015.

Albums

Studio albums

Live albums

Compilation albums

Video albums

Extended plays

Singles

As lead artist

As featured artist

Other charted songs

Other appearances

Music videos

As lead artist

As featured artist

Notes

See also
 John Mayer Trio discography

References

External links
 Official website
 John Mayer at AllMusic
 
 

Discographies of American artists
Rock music discographies
Discography